The Outsiders is a 1983 American coming-of-age crime drama film directed by Francis Ford Coppola. The film is an adaptation of the 1967 novel of the same name by S. E. Hinton and was released on March 25, 1983, in the United States. Jo Ellen Misakian, a librarian at Lone Star Elementary School in Fresno, California, and her students were responsible for inspiring Coppola to make the film.

The film is noted for its cast of up-and-coming stars, including C. Thomas Howell (who garnered a Young Artist Award), Rob Lowe, in his feature film debut, Emilio Estevez, Matt Dillon, Tom Cruise, Patrick Swayze, Ralph Macchio, and Diane Lane. The film helped spark the Brat Pack genre of the 1980s. Dillon would also star in two more films based on Hinton novels: Tex (1982) with Estevez and Coppola's Rumble Fish (1983) with Lane. Estevez wrote and starred in the Hinton adaptation That Was Then... This Is Now (1985).

The film received mostly positive reviews from critics, most notably for its performances, and performed well at the box office, grossing $33.7 million on a $10 million budget. Over the years, the film has earned a cult following.

Plot
The Curtis brothers' parents are dead, so eldest brother Darrel ("Darry") is left to raise and support his two younger brothers, Ponyboy and Sodapop ("Soda"), in 1965 Tulsa, Oklahoma. Some socially affluent teens harass and assault Ponyboy until some of his fellow greasers chase them off. The next night, he, Johnny and Dallas catch a movie at the local drive-in, where Dallas flirts with "Soc" Cherry Valance. Unsuccessful, he leaves, however, Cherry invites Ponyboy and Johnny to sit with her and Marcia. Later, while walking the two teen girls home, their boyfriends, Socs Bob and Randy, take umbrage at this, so the girls leave with them to avoid any escalation.

Pony and Johnny walk to an abandoned lot, instead of home, so Johnny can avoid his parents' routinely volatile bickering and domestic violence. He laments the hopelessness of his young life, both domestically and within the socio-economic structures established at school. Falling asleep, Ponyboy awakens a few hours later and rushes home, fearing discipline from his elder brother, who rebukes and even strikes him. He runs off to a local park with Johnny. They climb on the jungle gym, reminiscing about their childhood until they are confronted, chased, and attacked by Bob, Randy and three other Socs. Johnny is beaten, and Pony almost drowned in the park's fountain, until Johnny stabs Bob, killing him.
 
Fearful of the legal ramifications, Ponyboy and Johnny find Dallas, who gives them money for food and a loaded gun. They flee to Windrixville, Oklahoma, hopping on a train and then hiding in an abandoned church there, where they dye their hair, play poker, and read Gone with the Wind to each other. Four days later, Dallas visits; he has lied to the police, who are now searching in Texas. A note from his brother Sodapop exhorts Ponyboy to come home, as Cherry is willing to testify on their behalf. While buying food, Johnny favors turning themselves in, but Dallas disagrees.

Returning to the church, they discover that it's on fire with children trapped inside. They rescue them but are burned, and Johnny breaks his back. Ponyboy reunites with his two older brothers in the hospital and then returns home. Their heroic deed has made the cover of the local paper, but a judge may send Ponyboy to a boys' home.

Ponyboy and Two-Bit visit Johnny and Dallas in the hospital. Ponyboy asks Two-Bit to buy another copy of Gone with the Wind at the hospital gift shop. When Johnny's abusive mother comes, he refuses her visit, so she takes out her ire on Ponyboy and Two-Bit, who decries her as a bad mother. Dallas encourages them to win the upcoming rumble, sparked by Bob's death, for Johnny.

Later, Ponyboy meets with Cherry about the court. She won't visit Johnny at the hospital as he killed Bob. Later that night, the greasers, including Dallas, who left the hospital, win the rumble. Afterward, Dallas drives an injured Ponyboy to the hospital to see Johnny. After Ponyboy tells him about the greasers' victory, Johnny is ambivalent and dies after telling Ponyboy to "stay gold".

Enraged and devastated over Johnny's death, Dallas robs a store but is shot by the owner. He calls Darrell to meet him in the park and help hide him. The police arrive first, surrounding Dallas. He commits suicide by cop, pointing an empty gun at them.

The judge exonerates Ponyboy for Bob's death in court and places him in Darrell's custody. Later at school, Cherry sees Ponyboy and ignores him. He is offered a passing grade by his English teacher, to write a quality, personal experience essay, but is uninspired.

Inside Johnny's copy of Gone with the Wind is a letter explaining how saving the children was worth sacrificing his life, and admonishes Ponyboy to "never change", thus "stay gold".

Johnny's letter inspires Ponyboy's essay, "The Outsiders". The story begins: "When I stepped out into the bright sunlight from the darkness of the movie house, I had only two things on my mind: Paul Newman, and a ride home."

Cast

In addition, Sofia Coppola (credited as Domino), daughter of the film's director, plays the child asking the greasers for 15 cents, and S E Hinton plays Dally’s nurse. Brief uncredited appearances include Melanie Griffith; and Heather Langenkamp.

Production

Development
Francis Ford Coppola had not intended to make a film about teen angst until Jo Ellen Misakian, a school librarian from Lone Star Elementary School in Fresno, California, wrote to him on behalf of her seventh and eighth grade students about adapting The Outsiders.

 "We are all so impressed with the book, The Outsiders by SE Hinton, that a petition has been circulated asking that it be made into a movie. We have chosen you to send it to."

Approximately 15 pages of children's signatures were attached to the letter written in different colors. Moved by the letter, Coppola read the book and was impressed by the relationships between the greaser kids. It brought back memories of when he had been a drama counselor working with children at a summer camp in his youth.

Casting
The casting process led to debut or star-making performances of actors who would be collectively referred to throughout the 80s as the Brat Pack: C. Thomas Howell, Matt Dillon, Patrick Swayze, Ralph Macchio, Rob Lowe, Emilio Estevez and Tom Cruise. Mickey Rourke, Scott Baio, and Dennis Quaid also auditioned for roles but were not cast. Producer Fred Roos, a frequent collaborator with Coppola, was partially responsible for the film's casting. In particular, he scouted Patrick Swayze based on his performance in the roller skating movie Skatetown, U.S.A. (1979). Val Kilmer was approached to play Ponyboy but he turned it down as he was prepping a Broadway play Slab Boys.

Ralph Macchio stated that during auditions, Coppola "wanted everybody to read for a different role." He said that Coppola had all of the actors "in one room watching each other audition...It’s brutal because you’re becoming self-conscious of any choices because you’re watching reactions based on other actors and watching the filmmakers and how they respond because you’re all trying to get the job. For Francis, it was about mixing and matching the ensemble, saying 'Dennis Quaid, you read this, and Rob Lowe, you read that.  As a New Yorker who didn't know any of the other actors auditioning, Macchio also stated that he felt like an outsider during the process.

Filming

The film was shot on location in Tulsa, Oklahoma. Filming took place from March 29 to May 15, 1982. A newspaper used to show a story about the three greasers saving the kids in The Outsiders includes a real story from 1982 regarding the death of a man hit by a train in Boston. Coppola's craving for realism almost led to disaster during the church-burning scene. He pressed for "more fire", and the small, controlled blaze accidentally triggered a much larger, uncontrolled fire, which a downpour doused.

The original length of the film was two hours and 13 minutes. Warner Bros. felt that the film was a mistake and was too long. As a result, Coppola cut it down to 91 minutes for the theatrical release.

The pranks that went on during the filming have become legendary, mostly initiated by Matt Dillon, Rob Lowe, Tom Cruise, and Patrick Swayze. The targets were often C. Thomas Howell and Diane Lane. Ralph Macchio was not involved because he was so focused on getting his role right. The author of the original novel, S.E. Hinton, was involved during the filming as she and Coppola wrote the screenplay together; she appears as a nurse near the end of the film. She also later stated that she served as an informal "den mother" to many of the actors, as she was "close to all of them."

Soundtrack

Reception

Critical response
Review aggregator Rotten Tomatoes has a rating of 69% based on 48 reviews, with an average score of 6.3/10. The site's consensus reads, "The cracks continue to show in Coppola's directorial style, but The Outsiders remains a blustery, weird, and fun adaptation of the classic novel." Roger Ebert awarded the film two and a half out of four stars, citing problems with Coppola's vision, "the characters wind up like pictures, framed and hanging on the screen." Metacritic gave the film a score of 45, indicating "mixed or average reviews".

The film's casting directors Janet Hirshenson and Jane Jenkins, wrote in a 2007 book that the film's realistic portrayal of poor teenagers "created a new kind of filmmaking, especially about teenagers — a more naturalistic look at how young people talk, act, and experience the world. This movie was one of the few Hollywood offerings to deal realistically with kids from the wrong side of the tracks, and to portray honestly children whose parents had abused, neglected, or otherwise failed them."

Stéphane Delorme, in his book on Coppola, wrote: "The Outsiders is a wonder. And wonder is also the subject of the film. 'Stay Gold', says the song over the title credits. (...) The artificiality of the rural setting, which is as fake as in The Night of the Hunter, places us in the distant, mythical past. It takes only dye to turn these blond heads into golden heads, and thus to go from nostalgia for one's youth in the 1960s to a general regret for a golden age."

Accolades
The Outsiders was nominated for four Young Artist Awards, given annually since 1978 by the Young Artist Foundation. C. Thomas Howell won "Best Young Motion Picture Actor in a Feature Film". Diane Lane was nominated for "Best Young Supporting Actress in a Motion Picture". The film was nominated for "Best Family Feature Motion Picture". Francis Ford Coppola was nominated for the Golden Prize at the 13th Moscow International Film Festival.

Aftermath and legacy

"The Complete Novel" re-release 
On September 20, 2005, Coppola re-released the film on DVD, including 22 minutes of additional footage and new music, as a two-disc set called The Outsiders: The Complete Novel. Coppola re-inserted some deleted scenes to make the film more faithful to the book. This brought it up to a 114-minute running time. At the beginning of the film, he added scenes where Ponyboy gets stalked and jumped, the gang talks about going to the movies, Sodapop and Ponyboy talk in their room, and Dally, Pony, and Johnny bum around before going to the movies. At the end, Coppola added the scenes taking place in court, Mr. Syme talking to Ponyboy, and Sodapop, Ponyboy, and Darry in the park.

Coppola's father, Carmine Coppola, had written a soaring, romantic score for the original release, which at the time Coppola felt may have been the wrong choice, but he was not prepared to say that to him. By the time he came to recut the movie for "The Complete Novel" re-release his father had died, which allowed Coppola the opportunity to balance Carmine Coppola's music with music popular in the 1960s as well as new music composed by Michael Seifert and Dave Pruitt.

The film was re-rated by the MPAA as PG-13 for "violence, teen drinking and smoking, and some sexual references".

Disc 2 of the DVD includes some unique features, featuring behind-the-scenes interviews with the cast and crew, readings from the novel, additional deleted scenes, the original theatrical trailer, and an NBC News Today segment from 1983 talking about how The Outsiders has inspired teenagers across the world.

The director also removed three scenes that were in the theatrical version to improve pacing. Those scenes were Ponyboy and Johnny looking at their reflections in the lake and talking about their hair, attempting to catch a rabbit, and playing poker. They can be found on the second disc as additional scenes, along with other deleted scenes that were filmed, but not put into the movie. In addition, Swayze, Macchio, Lane, and Howell gathered at Coppola's estate to watch the re-release, and their commentary is included on the DVD. Dillon and Lowe provided separate commentary.

A Blu-ray edition of The Outsiders: The Complete Novel was released in Region A on June 3, 2014.

A manufacture-on-demand Ultra HD Blu-ray containing both versions of The Outsiders including The Complete Novel, was released through Warner Archive Collection on November 9, 2021.

Sequel TV series 

A television series based on the characters of the novel and film aired in 1990. It consists of a different cast playing the same characters. It picks up right after the events of the film's ending and lasted only one season.

Stage musical adaptation 
A stage musical based on both the novel and film has been in the works as of 2022 and is expected to hold its world premiere at La Jolla Playhouse in February/March 2023. The production will be directed by Danya Taymor from a libretto by Adam Rapp, with songs by Jamestown Revival and music supervision, arrangements, and orchestrations by Justin Levine.

The Outsiders House Museum and local preservations of the film locations 
The Outsiders House Museum opened in Tulsa, Oklahoma, on August 9, 2019. In 2009, hip-hop artist Danny Boy O'Connor discovered the house that was used  for the Curtis Brothers's home. Moving forward, O'Connor kept the thought of buying it, which he eventually did in 2016. O'Connor said he bought it sight unseen and when he first went inside that it was falling apart. With the help of friends, the Oklahoma Film and Music Office, the City Council, local businesses, and individuals who volunteered, the restoration started. After enough funds had been raised, the house went through extensive renovations to restore it and maintain its authenticity from the film. 

In 2016, a GoFundMe was set up to raise additional funds;   notable donors included Jack White, who donated $30,000, and Billy Idol. That same year, supporters organized film screenings featuring actor C. Thomas Howell, and the corner street signs were changed to "The Outsiders way" and "The Curtis Brothers Lane."   The museum now contains a collection of The Outsiders memorabilia. In addition to Howell, other stars of the film including Rob Lowe, Ralph Macchio, and Matt Dillon visited the site between its restoration and opening. For his efforts on preserving a cultural landmark O'Connor received a key to the city of Tulsa.

In 2022, in Sperry, Oklahoma, the group Upward Sperry restored the now un-operational DX gas station seen in the film. The group's president Gary Coulson said, “It’s really growing. I almost hate to say, but it’s almost like a cult following. They stream through here - what that does is get people here.” With O'Connor they are planning to revitalize Outsiders nostalgia in Sperry.

Set photography book The Outsiders ‘Rare and Unseen’ 
In October 2022, O'Connor with The Outsiders House Museum published the book The Outsiders ‘Rare and Unseen,’ which contains 148 photos by David Burnett, who was the set's photographer. O'Connor said: “We originally got the first lot of photos and then [Burnett] said there may be more. They found the rougher photos, and for me, that’s where the rubber meets the road because they [the actors]’re unpolished, their guard’s down, they’re not posing".

See also
 List of hood films

References

External links

 
 
 
 
 Revisiting 'The Outsiders' After The Immediacy Of Adolescence's Plights Have Passed - July 31, 2018, WBUR-FM

1980s coming-of-age drama films
1980s buddy drama films
1980s teen drama films
1983 drama films
1983 films
American buddy drama films
American coming-of-age drama films
American gang films
American teen drama films
American Zoetrope films
1980s English-language films
Fictional nonets
Films about dysfunctional families
Films adapted into television shows
Films based on American novels
Films based on young adult literature
Films directed by Francis Ford Coppola
Films scored by Carmine Coppola
Films set in 1965
Films set in Tulsa, Oklahoma
Films shot in Oklahoma
Warner Bros. films
Films about juvenile delinquency
Films about friendship
1980s American films